Hewitt's Dairy Ltd. is a small dairy producer in Hagersville, Ontario, Canada and founded in 1887. The dairy is also a producer of goat's milk.

Hewitt's products are sold over much of Ontario, especially within the Golden Horseshoe region. In the U.S., Vermont Creamery is one of their customers.

References
 Hewitts Dairy

Dairy products companies of Canada
Food and drink companies established in 1887
1887 establishments in Ontario